The FAI World Air Games (WAG) is an international air sports event organized by Fédération Aéronautique Internationale (World Air Sports Federation - FAI), inspired by the Olympic Games.

Competitions
Aerobatics
Aeromodeling
Air racing
Ballooning
Gliding
Hang gliding
Helicopter
Microlight
Parachuting
Paragliding

Games History

 https://www.fai.org/worldairgames
 http://ipc-wcresults.org.uk/
 http://ipc-wcresults.org.uk/WAG15/results.html : 5th FAI World Air Games 2015 - Dubai, UAE - 1–12 December 2015

WAG 2009
The FAI announced on 27 October 2007 the opening of the bidding for the 2009 Games. Turin (Italy) has been chosen to host the World Air Games 2009. The decision was announced by the President of FAI - the World Air Sports Federation, Pierre Portmann, on first of June 2007 at the Olympic Museum, Lausanne.

WAG 2015

The FAI World Air Games 2015 has been awarded to the United Arab Emirates and was held in Dubai. This multi-discipline event was organised by the Emirates Aerosports Federation under the patronage of the Crown Prince of Dubai, His Highness Sheikh Hamdan bin Mohammed bin Rashid Al Maktoum and took place from 1 to 12 December 2015. 875 athletes from 55 countries competed in the Games, making it the biggest air sports event ever organised.

WAG 2022
The FAI World Air Games 2022 will take place in Turkey and will be organised by the Turkish Aeronautical Association (THK). The contract for the Games was signed by THK and FAI at the Olympic Museum in Lausanne, Switzerland, in February 2018.

Games cancellation

2005 cancellation
In early 2005, the FAI Executive Board decided not to continue with the selection procedure for the organisation of World Air Games in 2005. The Board judged that there was insufficient time remaining for the two final bidders, Malaysia and Poland, to solve the various organisational problems.

2011 cancellation
On 16 June 2010 the FAI announced the cancellation of the 2011 Games, following the decision of the city of Odense not to host the Games, and uncertainty and risks around a proposed late change to host the games in the city of Herning, also in Denmark.

2022 cancellation
On 20 January 2020 the FAI announced the Cancellation of the 2022 Games, due to Covid-19 pandemic.

See also
1997 World Air Games
Air sports

References

External links
World Air Games, official WAG news on FAI website
World Air Games 2009, official site of WAG 2009
World Air Games 2015, official site of WAG 2015
World AIr Games 2015 Results

Aviation competitions and awards
Recurring sporting events established in 1997
Multi-sport events